Propidium iodide (or PI) is a fluorescent intercalating agent that can be used to stain cells and nucleic acids. PI binds to DNA by intercalating between the bases with little or no sequence preference. When in an aqueous solution, PI has a fluorescent excitation maximum of 493 nm (blue-green), and an emission maximum of 636 nm (red). After binding DNA, the quantum yield of PI is enhanced 20-30 fold, and the excitation/emission maximum of PI is shifted to 535 nm (green) / 617 nm (orange-red). Propidium iodide is used as a DNA stain in flow cytometry to evaluate cell viability or DNA content in cell cycle analysis,  or in microscopy to visualize the nucleus and other DNA-containing organelles. Propidium Iodide is not membrane-permeable, making it useful to differentiate necrotic, apoptotic and healthy cells based on membrane integrity. PI also binds to RNA, necessitating treatment with nucleases to distinguish between RNA and DNA staining. PI is widely used in fluorescence staining and visualization of the plant cell wall.

See also 
 Viability assay
 Vital stain
SYBR Green I
Ethidium bromide

References

Flow cytometry
DNA-binding substances
Iodides
Phenanthridine dyes
Staining dyes